Petzeas was a Byzantine commander and provincial governor under Alexios I Komnenos.

He is only known from a few brief references in the Alexiad. In 1098, he was a subaltern of the megas doux John Doukas during the latter's campaign to recover the Aegean littoral of Anatolia from the Seljuq Turks. Following the recapture of Ephesus, Petzeas was appointed as the city's governor (doux). He remained in the post until 1105/6, when he was sent to replace Kantakouzenos as the governor of Laodicea on the Lycus. Nothing further is known of him.

References

Sources
 

11th-century births
12th-century deaths
11th-century Byzantine people
12th-century Byzantine people
Byzantine governors
Officials of Alexios I Komnenos
Byzantine people of the Byzantine–Seljuk wars
Ephesus